Larry Arbuthnot (born 9 May 1947) is a Canadian luger. He competed at the 1968 Winter Olympics, the 1972 Winter Olympics and the 1976 Winter Olympics.

References

1947 births
Living people
Canadian male lugers
Olympic lugers of Canada
Lugers at the 1968 Winter Olympics
Lugers at the 1972 Winter Olympics
Lugers at the 1976 Winter Olympics
People from Saint-Laurent, Quebec
Sportspeople from Montreal